The 1990 CFL Draft composed of eight rounds where 64 Canadian football players were chosen from eligible Canadian universities and Canadian players playing in the NCAA.

1st round

2nd round
9. Saskatchewan Roughriders              Bruce Boyko              SB/TE               Western Michigan

10. British Columbia Lions               Ken Whitney              G/TE                California Lutheran

11. Winnipeg Blue Bombers            Dave Boveil              CB/S                Carleton

12. British Columbia Lions               Keith Kelly  TB  Bishop's

13. Calgary Stampeders                   Mark Singer  LB/FB  Alberta

14. Edmonton Eskimos                     Bob MacDonald  T/LS  McMaster

15. Saskatchewan Roughriders             Chris Gioskos            T/G                  Ottawa

16. Saskatchewan Roughriders             Brent Chuhaniuk          P/K                    Weber State

3rd round
17. Toronto Argonauts                    Paul Kerr  DE/DT  McGill

18. Calgary Stampeders                   Pat Hinds  T/G  San Jose State

19. Winnipeg Blue Bombers                Allan Boyko  WR  Western Michigan

20. Toronto Argonauts                    John Yule  LB  Manitoba

21. Saskatchewan Roughriders             Craig Henderson  T/G  Minnesota

22. Edmonton Eskimos                     Lance Trumble            FB/DE                    McMaster

23. Hamilton Tiger-Cats                  Richard Nurse            WR/DB                  Canisius

24. Saskatchewan Roughriders             Bill Hitchcock           T/DT                   Purdue

4th round

5th round

6th round
41. Ottawa Rough Riders                  Cam Sackschewsky         G/T                      Calgary

42. British Columbia Lions               Doug Shorman             LB  British Columbia

43. Winnipeg Blue Bombers                Steve Zatylny            WR                       Bishop's

44. Toronto Argonauts                    Gerry Ilfill             TB                       McGill

45. Calgary Stampeders                   Kevin Kazan              WR/K                     Calgary

46. Edmonton Eskimos                     Chris Porter  TB  Windsor

47. Hamilton Tiger-Cats                  John Monaco              TB/SB                    Canisius

48. Ottawa Rough Riders                  Brett Wilson             WR                       Ottawa

7th round
49. Ottawa Rough Riders                  Jamie Coombs             DL/G                     Carleton

50. British Columbia Lions               Phil Poirer              DT/DE                Cincinnati

51. Winnipeg Blue Bombers                Lorne McCasin            DE/DT                North Dakota

52. Toronto Argonauts                    Richard MacLean          T  Saint Mary's

53. Calgary Stampeders                   Randy Power              LB  Mount Allison

54. Edmonton Eskimos                     Maki Katsube             SB/RB  St. Francis Xavier

55. Hamilton Tiger-Cats                  Jeff Martens  OL/DT  Alberta

56. Ottawa Rough Riders                  Hagen Mehnert             LB                      McGill

8th round
57. Ottawa Rough Riders                  Darryl Forde             CB/DB                    Western Ontario

58. British Columbia Lions               Richard Kitchener        OT/OL                    Simon Fraser

59. Winnipeg Blue Bombers                Ray Wiens                  OL                     Saskatchewan

60. Toronto Argonauts                    Marco Arbour               LB                     Ottawa

61. Calgary Stampeders                   Sean Furlong               WR                     Calgary

62. Edmonton Eskimos                     Ron Webert                P/K  Washington State

63. Hamilton Tiger-Cats                  Mike Raymond               FB                     York

64. Ottawa Rough Riders                  Mike Koladich              LB                     Western Ontario

References
Canadian Draft

Canadian College Draft
Cfl Draft, 1990